The 2020 Calgary Stampeders season was scheduled to be the 63rd season for the team in the Canadian Football League and their 76th overall. Training camps, pre-season games, and regular season games were initially postponed due to the COVID-19 pandemic in Alberta. The CFL announced on April 7, 2020 that the start of the 2020 season would not occur before July 2020. On May 20, 2020, it was announced that the league would likely not begin regular season play prior to September 2020. On August 17, 2020 however, the season was officially cancelled due to COVID-19. 

This season would have been Dave Dickenson's fifth season as head coach and John Hufnagel's 13th season as general manager. The team had planned to celebrate the 75th anniversary of the team's inception in 1945.

Offseason

CFL National Draft
The 2020 CFL National Draft took place on April 30, 2020. The Stampeders obtained the first overall pick after completing a trade with the Ottawa Redblacks that saw the teams swap first-round picks and Calgary acquire another third-round pick following the trade and subsequent re-signing of Nick Arbuckle to the Redblacks. However, shortly after the draft began, the Stampeders then traded the first and 15th overall picks to the BC Lions for the third and 12th overall picks.

The Stampeders also traded their fifth-round selection and Justin Renfrow to BC in exchange for a fourth-round pick in this year's draft and a negotiation list player.

CFL Global Draft
The 2020 CFL Global Draft was scheduled to take place on April 16, 2020. However, due to the COVID-19 pandemic, this draft and its accompanying combine were postponed to occur just before the start of training camp, which was ultimately cancelled. The Stampeders were scheduled to select sixth in each round with the number of rounds never announced.

Planned schedule

Preseason

Regular season

Team

Roster

Coaching staff

References

External links
 

Calgary Stampeders seasons
2020 Canadian Football League season by team
2020 in Alberta